KPRS (103.3 FM) is an urban contemporary radio station licensed to Kansas City, Missouri.  The station's playlist consists of hip-hop, R&B, and gospel music.  According to the Federal Communications Commission (FCC), it is the oldest continually African American family-owned radio station in the United States.  The station is owned by Carter Broadcast Group, and its studios are located in South Kansas City, as well as its transmitter (located separately).

History 
In 1950, Andrew "Skip" Carter began operating KPRS as the nation's first Black radio station west of the Mississippi River with a transmitter donated by former Kansas governor, Alf Landon.  KPRS debuted as a 500-watt daytimer at 1590 AM, with a playlist that consisted of R&B and soul.  In 1951, KPRS opened its first studio at 12th and Walnut Street in Kansas City, Missouri.  By 1952, Carter and Ed and Psyche Pate became business partners and purchased the station for $40,000 from the Johnson County Broadcasting Corporation.  They moved KPRS to a new site at 2814 East 23rd Street in Kansas City.

KPRS applied for an FM license on May 22, 1961, which was granted on December 20, 1961. KPRS-FM received its first license on May 16, 1963, and went on the air that year.

In 1969, the Carters had controlling interest in the station. In 1971, KPRS (AM) moved its programming to the 103.3 frequency on the FM dial under the KPRS-FM call letters and moniker “K103” (which would later be rebranded as "Hot 103 Jamz" in the 1990s), while the 1590 frequency became an urban gospel-formatted station.  The studios and offices moved to the Crown Center and the Carters moved to Florida to open a new corporate headquarters. KPRS-FM would drop the -FM suffix on October 15, 1974, when its sister AM station changed its callsign to KPRT that same day. In 1975, KPRS became one of the first fully automated radio stations in the Midwest, and in the country for that matter.  DJs such as Chris King and Freddie Bell read news updates, while also announcing songs.  (Bell called himself "Frederick" during newscasts.)

Ensuring the business would remain a family-run entity, Michael Carter, Andrew's grandson, was named president of the company. One of his first moves was to take both stations back to the "live" formats. Michael Carter, who actually made his radio debut at age 8 on KPRS, also made KPRS a 24-hour station.

In January 1988, station owner Andrew Carter died at his Florida home. The Black radio pioneer's legacy lived on and moved forward; to honor Carter's legacy, KPRS Broadcasting Corporation would change their name to the Carter Broadcast Group in 1993. His widow, Mildred Carter became chairperson of the board and the stations continued to grow and to solidify its standing in the Black community with various outreach programs and promotions. In 1990, KPRS jumped from 8th to 5th in the Kansas City market, according to the Arbitrons.  Also in the 1990s, KPRS stopped playing what it perceived as negative hip-hop or gangsta rap and explicit and overtly sexual R&B. In 1995, KPRS picked up the Crystal Award from the National Association of Broadcasters. The Carter Broadcast Group celebrated its 45th anniversary in 1995, and had its highest ratings ever, reaching the number one slot for that year. In 2000, the company celebrated its 50th anniversary. In 2005, the station became an affiliate of the Steve Harvey Morning Show.

The Carter Broadcast Group, owners of KPRS and KPRT, along with The Sherman Broadcast Group, were co-owners of an Urban Contemporary station known as KSJM, “107-9 Jamz”, in Wichita, Kansas. In late 2007, the two groups sold KSJM to The Ag Network Group, which dropped the Urban format for Country as KWLS "US-107.9" on January 19, 2008.

In fall 2009, KPRS added more rhythmic/pop crossover titles from artists like Justin Bieber, Miley Cyrus, Iyaz, Kesha, Katy Perry, and Jason DeRulo. This was most likely due to the implementation of the PPM in the Kansas City Arbitron ratings. This caused significant controversy, as the only Hip Hop/R&B station in the Kansas City market was, in the eyes of many in its audience, attempting to lean Rhythmic to attract a female audience in addition to being more client-friendly towards different race groups. The station has since ended this tactic.

In August 2010, the station dropped Steve Harvey due to low ratings, and was replaced by "More Music In The Mornings" with J.T. Quick. Morning drive-time ratings significantly improved.

In April 2011, management made a change within the programming department by relieving operations manager Andre Carson, and replaced him with longtime music director Myron Fears.

In July 2011, KPRS repositioned its DJ lineup to help improve its ratings.  The morning show changed from "More Music In the Mornings" to "The Morning Jam", and was now hosted by station veterans Tony G and Sean Tyler. Julee Jonez hosts the mid-day show, while J.T. Quick moved from morning drive to afternoon drive, and the night show is rotated by Brian B. Shynin', Brooklyn Martino and Playmaker.

In June 2012, KPRS returned to the #1 position in the Kansas City Arbitron ratings. Since September 2012, KPRS has been one of the Top 3 performing radio stations in Kansas City and one of the highest ratings performing urban-formatted radio stations in the United States.

HD Radio
In 2016, KPRS launched an HD2 sub-channel, which aired a classic hip hop/R&B format. The station now airs an urban oldies format as "K-103.3 HD-2"

Competition
Appropriate for a heritage Urban station, KPRS continues to thrive well in the Kansas City market, even with its main current competitor Urban KMJK.

Station management 
 Operations Manager Myron Fears
 Community Relations/Public Affairs Director Rich McCauley
 Station Voice Pat Garrett

References

External links
Official HOT 103 JAMZ Website
K-103.3 HD-2 Website

History cards for KPRS from the F.C.C.'s website.

Urban contemporary radio stations in the United States
PRS